Yarand (also Romanized as Yārand) is a village in Barzrud Rural District, in the Central District of Natanz County, Isfahan Province, Iran. At the time of the 2006 census, its population was 130, in 52 families.

References 

Populated places in Natanz County